Furkan Akar (born 6 March 2002) is a Turkish Olympian short track speed skater. He is the first representative of Turkey at the Olympic Games in short track speed skating. He is also the first and only Turkish athlete placed in "Top 10" at the Winter Olympics by finishing 6th in the 1000-meter event at the 2022 Winter Olympics held in Beijing, China. Akar finished third (1:34.780) and gained a bronz medal in the 2023 European Championship 1000 metres race, a first for Turkey.

Early years
Furkan Akar was born in Erzurum, Turkey on 6 March 2002. He started  motivated performing winter sportby his brother while he was watching him in training. At age of nine, he began skiing.

He is a student of Sport coaching in the Sport Science Faculty at Atatürk University in Erzurum.

Sports career
Akar competes in short track speed skating with the license of Erzurum G.S.İ.M. He has been in the national team since 2015.

He took the bronze medal in the Boys' 500m and the silver medal in the 1500m event at the 2019 European Youth Olympic Winter Festival held in Sarajevo, Bosnia and Herzegovina.

He participated in the Men's 1000m event at the 2021–22 ISU Speed Skating World Cup, where he ranked 17th. He won a place at the 2022 Winter Olympics in Beijing, China. He was named flagbearer along with Ayşenur Duman at the opening ceremony of the 2022 Winter Olympics. He competed in the short track speed skating 1000m event, and finished the Final B in second place with 1:36.052. He ranked 6th in total.

See also
 Turkey at the 2019 European Youth Olympic Winter Festival
 Turkey at the 2022 Winter Olympics.

References

2002 births
Living people
Sportspeople from Erzurum
Atatürk University alumni
Olympic short track speed skaters of Turkey
Turkish male short track speed skaters
Short track speed skaters at the 2022 Winter Olympics
Competitors at the 2023 Winter World University Games